AMA Supersport is an American motorcycle racing series. The race series was founded and sanctioned by the American Motorcyclist Association (AMA) in 1987.

The road racing series allows motorcycles of up to 600cc engine capacity. The American Motorcycle Association uses member clubs, partners, and promoters to put together more competitive and recreational motorcycling events than anyone else in the country. Daytona Motorsports Group owns and manages the AMA Supersport Championship. In the AMA Supersport Championship, motorcyclists reach speeds over 160 miles per hour over a 40-mile sprint race.

The class was formerly known as 600 Supersport, while the Superstock class was known as 750 Supersport.

Champions

See also
 AMA Superbike Championship
 AMA Pro Daytona Sportbike Championship

References

External links
Official AMA Racing Site 

 
Supersport racing
Motorcycle road racing series